Jhalod Taluka, also known as Zalod Taluka, is a Taluka located in Dahod District in North Gujarat. The city of Jhalod is the Taluka's administrative headquarters. Jhalod Taluka is the largest taluka by population and area in Dahod District. Jhalod is a large town of historical and commercial importance and serves as administrative headquarters of Jhalod Taluka in Dahod District, Gujarat, India. It is situated on the eastern border of the Gujarat State, 5 km far from Kushalgarh Tehsil in Banswara District of Rajasthan State border near the Titodi River. It was one of the original "five mahals" of the Panchmahal District within the Bombay Province during the British Raj in India. The Taluka was made up by joining the territories of Sanjeli State and Jhalod Mahal together.

Jhalod Taluka is situated between 23-06 North latitude and 74-09 East longitudes. The Jhalod Taluka is bounded by Panchmahal District to the west, Limkheda & Dahod Block to the South, Jhabua District (Madhya Pradesh) to the East and Banswada District (Rajasthan) to the North.
1. Taluka Panchayat Jhalod
2. Taluka Arogya Kacheri-Jhalod (Taluka Health Office-Jhalod)
3. Mamlardar Office
4. Prant Office
5. Police Station
6. Taluka Court

Cities and towns in Dahod district
Talukas of Gujarat